Devoted To Your Memory is the 22nd album by country singer Moe Bandy, released in 1983 on the Columbia label recorded at Woodland Studio "B".

Track listing

"Let's Get Over Them Together" - Duet with Becky Hobbs (Charlie Craig, Keith Stegall) - 2:43
"One More Port" (Dan Mitchell) - 3:02
"Devoted to Your Memory" (Dan Mitchell, Larry Shell) 2:57
"Don't Sing Me No Songs About Texas" - Duet with Merle Haggard (Marle Haggard, Leona Williams) - 2:37
"That's As Close to Cheatin' As I Came" (Dan Mitchell) - 2:05
"You're Gonna Lose Her Like That" (Peggy Forman, Wayne Forman) - 2:25
"The Barroom is My Battleground Tonight" (Tony Austin, Gene Dobbins, Johnny Wilson) - 2:42
"Country Side" - Duet with Becky Hobbs (Thom Schuyler) - 3:08
"Someone Like You" (Dan Mitchell, D. Lee) - 2:37
"She's Looking Good" (Justin Dickens, Rodger Collins) - 2:28

Musicians

Piano - Bobby Wood, Hargus "Pig" Robbins
Drums - Kenny Malone, Jerry Carrigan
Electric Guitar - Reggie Young, Gregg Galbraith
Steel Guitar - Weldon Myrick
Acoustic Guitar - Leo Jackson, Ray Edenton, Mark Casstevens
Bass Guitar - Henry Strzelecki, Mike Leech
Fiddle - Johnny Gimble, Hoot Hester
Harmonica - Terry McMillan

Backing

Strings - The Nashville String Machine
String Arrangements - Bergen White
Backing Vocals - The Jordanaires with Laverna Moore.

Production

Sound Engineers - Rick McCollister, Ron Reynolds, Ed Hudson

References

1983 albums
Moe Bandy albums
Columbia Records albums
Albums produced by Ray Baker (music producer)